is a Japanese manga artist from Chiba Prefecture. His works include Tenchi wo Kurau (1983–1984) and Salary Man Kintaro (1994–2002).

Career
Motomiya's Ore no Sora ran in Shueisha's Weekly Playboy from 1975–1978. It has spawned several sequel series and adaptations. He serialized Otokogi in Shogakukan's Big Comic from 1979 to 1980. It also spawned several sequel manga and adaptations.

Motomiya serialized Takeki Ōgon no Kuni in Shueisha's Business Jump from 1990 to 1992. It has spawned several sequels, each following a different figure from Japanese history.

On October 13, 2004, Shueisha suspended Motomiya's Kuni ga Moeru manga from Weekly Young Jump after 37 groups and more than 200 people complained about a photograph that was used in the series in mid-September. The original photo is purported to depict the Nanjing Massacre, but the uniform worn by the soldier does not match the time period, thus the photo has not been accurately verified. Motomiya drew it to have the accurate uniform, leading to complaints of misrepresenting history. The manga was suspended for five issues before resuming serialization. Shueisha censored the tankōbon edition of Kuni ga Moeru, by editing or removing 21 pages.

Motomiya began Nisemono? in July 2007 for the Pfizer pharmaceutical company. It was serialized on their Japanese website and aimed to help men who suffer from erectile dysfunction.

Katsu Fūtarō!! was serialized in Shueisha's Grand Jump from 2013 to 2016. In 2017, Motomiya launched Kōun Ryūsui in the same magazine. It follows Chinese explorer Xu Fu, who travels to Japan seeking the elixir of eternal life. He launched Good Job, a collaboration with Hiroshi Takano, in Weekly Young Jump the following year. It ran until July 2020. Motomiya briefly serialized Umi o Wataru be in Grand Jump for four months in 2020. The artist then serialized Boku, Imasu yo. in Weekly Young Jump from 2020 until 2021.

Moto Kikaku
Moto Kikaku (formerly Motomiya Kikaku) is a group of manga artists, founded by Motomiya. They are best known in the West for the Strider Hiryu manga (published by Kadokawa Shoten), which was developed as a tie-in to Capcom's video game hit Strider. The group had input in Strider 2's character designs, and the original manga's plot was adapted as the plot of the NES version.

However, Strider was not the only Moto Kikaku property to be adapted. Capcom based four games on Motomiya's Tenchi wo Kurau series: Destiny of an Emperor and Destiny of an Emperor II for the NES, and Dynasty Wars and Warriors of Fate for the CPS-1. 

Moto Kikaku is credited whenever Strider Hiryu appears in a game. On the staff roll for the PC-Engine port of Warriors of Fate, they share a "Special Thanks" credit on the same line with Hiroshi Motomiya.

Works

 - written by Hiroshi Takano

References

External links
 

Manga artists from Chiba Prefecture
Japan Air Self-Defense Force personnel
People from Chiba (city)
1947 births
Living people